

Æthelhun was a medieval Bishop of Worcester. He was consecrated either in 915 or between 907 and 915. He died either in 922 or between 915 and 922.

Citations

References

External links
 

Bishops of Worcester
10th-century English bishops